The Republic Tigers is an American alternative rock band formed in Kansas City, Missouri by Kenn Jankowski (formerly of The Golden Republic) and Adam McGill.  They were the first act to sign with Chop Shop Records (an imprint of Atlantic Records), owned by Alexandra Patsavas of Chop Shop Music Supervision.

History
Hailing from Kansas City, The Republic Tigers spike their lushly orchestrated fad rock with organic and synthetic elements. Founder Kenn Jankowski originally moved to Kansas City in 1999 and began playing guitar for The People, a band that later changed its name to The Golden Republic (Astralwerks Records). He also made fast friends with local musician Ryan Pinkston. When The Golden Republic disbanded seven years later, he opted to launch his own pop-based project with the other multi-instrumentalist. Taking their name from Jankowski's high school mascot, The Republic Tigers expanded their lineup and went on to play many shows and make many musics. The band issued a self-titled EP in late 2007 before putting the finishing touches on Keep Color, which arrived in 2008.

The group released their first full album, Keep Color, on May 6, 2008. It includes the singles Buildings & Mountains and Fight Song. On the week of September 14, 2008, Buildings And Mountains was featured as the free single of the week on iTunes. In late 2008, they embarked on their first overseas tour with the band Travis.  In 2009, they played at the annual "Buzz Beach Ball" event with Weezer, Blink 182, Matt & Kim, Taking Back Sunday, and others.

Since signing with Chop Shop Records, their music has been featured on several prime time network television shows including Grey's Anatomy, Gossip Girl, Chuck, Supernatural and Sunao ni Narenakute.

The Republic Tigers made their first nationally televised appearance on May 22, 2008 on the Late Show with David Letterman.

No Land’s Man (EP) was released on April 16, 2011, exclusively at indie record stores nationwide in celebration of Record Store Day. The digital release followed on April 19, as well as a 7” color vinyl release featuring Merrymake It With Me and an exclusive b-side, Whale Fight. The album was self-produced and recorded in Kansas City, MO and features a remix of The Nerve off of their 2008 Keep Color release.

The band had previously announced their second full-length album for release in 2012, to be titled Mind Over Matter, but due to "legal boundaries or hoops", the album was released for the first time on June 5, 2020 on the Record Machine label.

Front-man Kenn Jankowski began a side project in 2012, Jaenki.

New single Risky Business was released in 2020 on the Record Machine.

The year was 2020 - "Mind Over Matter" was finally released on hometown indie label The Record Machine. Then it was time to play live again and Kenn wanted a banger of a band, so he reached out to label mate’s Monta At Odds to make a deal that would benefit the entire world. And everyone got into heaven.

Members
Current:
Kenn Jankowski  - vocals, guitar, synth, programming
Ryan Pinkston   - guitar, vocals - studio
Dedric Moore - guitar, synth, background vocals
Krystof Nemeth - bass guitar
Mikal Shapiro - background vocals, acoustic guitar
Matthew Heinrich - drums
Lucas Behrens - guitar, baritone guitar, synth, background vocals

Former members:
Brent Windler   - bass
Justin Tricomi  - drums, vocals
Ryan Wallace    - lead guitar, keyboard
Also, audio engineer and musician David Gaume (The Stella Link) has become a fixture in the band as their traveling soundman and technician.
Justin Norcross  - guitar, vocals
Matt Casey - guitar, vocals
Marc Pepperman  - bass
Adam McGill     - guitar, vocals

Discography
Compilations:

First Blood OxBlood Records. Released May 2007.

The Impossible Dream Frank Sinatra cover. Available through (iTunes)

EPs:

Republic Tigers (Self-titled) Chop Shop Records. Released December 2007. Available through iTunes.

The Republic Tigers European Release Available through (iTunes)

No Land's Man Chop Shop Records. Released April 2011.

LPs:

Keep Color  Chop Shop Records. Released May 2008.

Keep Color on vinyl available through Amazon or at their concerts.

Mind Over Matter  Record Machine. Released June 2020.

Soundtracks:

OMFGG - Original Music Featured on Gossip Girl No. 1 Atlantic Records. September 2008.

References

External links
Official website
Republic Tigers MySpace Site
Chop Shop Records
Filter Magazine

NPR.org "Republic Tigers: Majestic Pop"
Popwreckoning.com "The Republic Tigers Announce No Land’s Man EP"

Alternative rock groups from Missouri
Musical groups from Kansas City, Missouri